Rachel Beasley Ray (January 31, 1849 – June 27, 1915) was a poet and author using the name Mattie M'Intosh.

Early life
Rachel Beasley was born in Anderson County, Kentucky, on January 31, 1849. She is known to the literary world as "Mattie M'Intosh." She was the fifth daughter of Judge Elisha Beasley and Almeda Penney, who reared eight girls, of whom Kate Carrington was the youngest. When she was an infant, her parents moved to Hickman County, Kentucky and settled in the town of Clinton, Kentucky. 

Judge Beasley gave his children every educational advantage within his reach, and the consequence was that the eight daughters became teachers.

Career
At the age of sixteen years Ray was left an orphan by the death of her mother, her father having died two years before. A few months later she entered Clinton Seminary, as both student and teacher. For fourteen years she was almost constantly employed in educational work, either as teacher or student, and often as both. She spent every spare moment during that time in writing stories, poems and practical articles. Her last school work was done in Clinton College (Kentucky), where she acted in the capacity of both student and teacher. 

For many years she indulged her fondness for the pen by contributing largely to different weeklies and periodicals. "The Ruined Home," a continued story, published in 1889, in a St. Louis weekly, gave her views on the use of alcoholic drinks. 

She was a member of the Baptist Church. Her husband was a Baptist and deacon in that church. The "Leaves from the Deacon's Wife's Scrap Book," which was well received by the public, were original and humorously written sketches from her daily life. 

She strongly favored woman's advancement and was a stanch advocate of the Temperance Movement. 

Judge Ray was a lawyer and real estate agent with extensive business, and Ray was his secretary. She wrote daily at a desk in his office, and in his absence had the entire charge of his business. 

Ray edited three Woman's Christian Temperance Union columns each week in the papers of her own city.

Personal life
Rachel Beasley married Edwin Ruthven Ray (1828-1915), of Hickman county, on October 10, 1878. 

In the summer of 1880 Ray had an attack of rheumatic lever, from which her recovery was so slow that a change of climate became necessary, and her husband took her to Eureka Springs, a health resort in Arkansas. There she improved sufficiently in a short time to resume her usual duties, and the family settled there permanently. 

Ray died on June 27, 1915, and is buried at Woodlawn Cemetery, Tampa, with her husband.

References

1849 births
1915 deaths
American women writers
Writers from Kentucky
People from Anderson County, Kentucky
Wikipedia articles incorporating text from A Woman of the Century